Cédric Paty (born 25 July 1981 in Châtillon-sur-Seine, Côte-d'Or) is a French handball player, who won a gold medal at the 2008 Summer Olympics.

References

1981 births
Living people
People from Châtillon-sur-Seine
French male handball players
Handball players at the 2008 Summer Olympics
Olympic handball players of France
Olympic gold medalists for France
Olympic medalists in handball
Medalists at the 2008 Summer Olympics
Sportspeople from Côte-d'Or